Damës may refer to the following places in Albania:
Damës, Fier, a village in the municipality of Mallakastër, Fier County
Damës, Gjirokastër, a village in the municipality of Memaliaj, Gjirokastër County